Mary MacLane (May 1, 1881 – c. August 6, 1929) was a controversial Canadian-born American writer whose frank memoirs helped usher in the confessional style of autobiographical writing. MacLane was known as the "Wild Woman of Butte".

MacLane was a popular author for her time, scandalizing the populace with her shocking bestselling first memoir and to a lesser extent her two following books. She was considered wild and uncontrollable, a reputation she nurtured, and was openly bisexual as well as a vocal feminist. In her writings, she compared herself to another frank young memoirist, Marie Bashkirtseff, who died a few years after MacLane was born, and H. L. Mencken called her "the Butte Bashkirtseff."

Early life and family 
MacLane was born in Winnipeg, Manitoba, Canada in 1881, but her family moved to the Red River area of Minnesota, settling in Fergus Falls, which her father helped develop. After his death in 1889, her mother remarried a family friend and lawyer, H. Gysbert Klenze. Soon after, the family moved to Montana, first settling in Great Falls and finally in Butte, where Klenze drained the family funds pursuing mining and other ventures. MacLane spent the remainder of her life in the United States. She began writing for her school paper in 1898.

Writing 

From the beginning, MacLane's writing was characterized by a direct, fiery, individualistic style. She was, however, also influenced by such American regional realists as John Townsend Trowbridge (with whom she exchanged a few letters), Maria Louise Pool, and Hamlin Garland.

In 1901, MacLane wrote her first book, which she originally titled I Await the Devil's Coming. Prior to the manuscript's printing the following year, MacLane's publisher, Herbert S. Stone & Company, altered the title to The Story of Mary MacLane. The book proved to be an immediate success, especially among young women, selling over 100,000 copies during its first month of release. It, however, was pilloried by conservative critics and readers, and even lightly ridiculed by H. L. Mencken. 

Some critics have suggested that even by today's standards, MacLane's writing is raw, honest, unflinching, self-aware, sensual, and extreme.  She wrote openly about egoism and her own self-love, about sexual attraction and love for other women, and even about her desire to marry the Devil.

Her second book, My Friend Annabel Lee was published by Stone in 1903. More experimental in style than her debut book, it was not as sensational, though MacLane was said to have made a fairly large amount of money.

Her final book, I, Mary Maclane: A Diary of Human Days was published by Frederick A. Stokes in 1917 and sold moderately well but may have been overshadowed by America's recent entry into World War I.

In 1917, she wrote and starred in the 90-minute autobiographical silent film titled Men Who Have Made Love to Me, for Essanay Studios. Produced by film pioneer George Kirke Spoor and based on MacLane's 1910 article of the same title for a Butte newspaper, it has been speculated to have been an extremely early, if not the earliest, sustained breaking of the fourth wall in cinema, with the writer-star directly addressing the audience. Though stills and some subtitles have survived, the film is now believed to be lost.

Influence 
Among the numerous authors who referenced, parodied, or answered MacLane were Mark Twain, F. Scott Fitzgerald, Harriet Monroe, lawyer Clarence Darrow, Ring Lardner Jr., Sherwood Anderson and Daniel Clowes in Ice Haven. Gertrude Sanborn published an optimistic riposte to MacLane's 1917 I, Mary MacLane under the title I, Citizen of Eternity (1920).

Personal life 
MacLane had always chafed, or felt, "anxiety of place," at living in Butte, a mining city far from cultural centers, and used the money from her first book's sales to travel to Chicago and then throughout the East Coast. She lived in Rockland, Massachusetts, wintering in St. Augustine, Florida, from 1903–1908, then in Greenwich Village from 1908–1909, where she continued writing and, by her later published accounts, living a decadent and Bohemian existence. She was close friends with the feminist writer Inez Haynes Irwin, who is referenced in some of MacLane's 1910 writing in a Butte newspaper and who in turn mentioned MacLane in a 1911 magazine article.

For a period, she lived with her friend Caroline M. Branson, who had been the long-time companion of Maria Louise Pool until the latter's death in 1898. They lived in the Rockland's house that Pool left to Branson. Mary Maclane also had a multi-decade friendship with Harriet Monroe.

MacLane died in Chicago in early August 1929, aged 48. She was less frequently discussed through the mid to late 20th century, and her prose remained out of print until late 1993, when The Story of Mary MacLane and some of her newspaper feature work was republished in Tender Darkness: A Mary MacLane Anthology.

Contemporary collections and performances 
In 2011, the publisher of Tender Darkness (1993) published an expanded anthology titled Human Days: A Mary MacLane Reader (with a Foreword by Bojana Novakovic).

In 2011, Novakovic wrote and performed "The Story of Mary MacLane – By Herself" in Melbourne, Australia, which was subsequently staged in Sydney, Australia in 2012.

In the 2010s, MacLane's work was translated into French, Danish, and Spanish. A German edition was published in 2020.

Bibliography

Books 
 The Story of Mary MacLane (1902)
 My Friend, Annabel Lee (1903)
 I, Mary MacLane: A Diary of Human Days (1917, 2013)
 Tender Darkness: A Mary MacLane Anthology (reprint) (1993)
 The Story of Mary MacLane and Other Writings (reprint anthology) (1999)
 Human Days: A Mary MacLane Reader (foreword by Bojana Novakovic) (2011)
 I Await the Devil's Coming (2013)

Selected articles 
 [Untitled article on stoicism] (1898)
 Consider Thy Youth and Therein (1899)
 Charles Dickens – Best of Castle-Builders (graduate oration, 1899)
 Mary MacLane at Newport (1902)
 Mary MacLane at Coney Island
 Mary MacLane on Wall Street (1902)
 Mary MacLane in Little Old New York (1902)
 On Marriage (1902)
 A Foreground and a Background (1903)
 Mary MacLane Discusses the ‘Outward Seeming of Denver’ (1903)
 The Second 'Story of Mary MacLane' (1909)
 Mary MacLane Soliloquizes on Scarlet Fever (1910)
 Mary MacLane Meets the Vampire on the Isle of Treacherous Delights (1910)
 The Autobiography of the Kid Primitive (1910)
 Mary MacLane Wants a Vote – For the Other Woman (1910)
 Men Who Have Made Love to Me (1910)
 The Latter-Day Litany of Mary MacLane (1910)
 The Borrower of Two-Dollar Bills – and Other Women (1910)
 A Waif of Destiny on the High Seas (1910)
 Woman and the Cigarette (1911)
 Mary MacLane Says – (1911)
 Mary MacLane on Marriage (1917)
 The Movies and Me (1918)

Screenplays and filmography 
 Men Who Have Made Love to Me (1918)

In popular culture
The 2020 novel Plain Bad Heroines features MacLane's life and work as a reoccurring interest for multiple characters in the book, which draws its title from a passage from MacLane's The Story of Mary MacLane.

Further reading
 Halverson, Cathryn. "The Devil and Desire in Butte, Montana." In Maverick Autobiographies: Women Writers and the American West, 1900-1936. Wisconsin Studies in Autobiography series, William L. Andrews, general editor. University of Wisconsin Press, 2004. Borrowable at Internet Archive.
 Mattern, Carolyn J., "Mary MacLane: A Feminist Opinion", Montana The Magazine of Western History, 27 (Autumn 1977), 54–63.
 Miller, Barbara, "'Hot as Live Embers—Cold as Hail': The Restless Soul of Butte's Mary MacLane", Montana Magazine, September 1982, 50–53.
 Terris, Virginia R., "Mary MacLane—Realist", The Speculator, Summer 1985, 42–49.
 Wheeler, Leslie A., "Montana's Shocking 'Lit'ry Lady'", Montana The Magazine of Western History, 27 (Summer 1977), 20–33.

References

External links

 Website with biography, photos, private letters, reviews
 Encyclopædia Britannica article by Julia Watson
 2013 Atlantic article by Hope Reese
 2013 New Yorker article
 
 
 
 Mary Maclane at Women Film Pioneers Project
 Mary MacLane in Spanish: Deseo que venga el diablo 

1881 births
1929 deaths
Bisexual women
American people of Canadian descent
American feminist writers
Bisexual memoirists
LGBT people from Montana
People from Butte, Montana
Writers from Chicago
Writers from Winnipeg
People from Fergus Falls, Minnesota
American women memoirists
Canadian feminist writers
20th-century American memoirists
Canadian memoirists
Canadian expatriate writers in the United States
People from Rockland, Massachusetts
Women film pioneers
Canadian women memoirists
20th-century American women
Canadian bisexual writers
American bisexual writers